The Sefadu diamond was found in the town of Sefadu in Sierra Leone in 1970.  The diamond is 620 carats making it the seventh largest diamond ever found and the largest still uncut diamond in the world.

See also
List of diamonds
List of largest rough diamonds

References 

Diamonds originating in Sierra Leone
1970 in Africa
Eastern Province, Sierra Leone